Crystal Mines II is a puzzle video game designed and programmed by Ken Beckett for Color Dreams. It was licensed to Atari Corporation for the Lynx handheld system. The game is a sequel to Crystal Mines for the Nintendo Entertainment System. Both releases are similar to Boulder Dash, a genre which has since become known as "rocks and diamonds" games.

There are 150 levels and 31 bonus levels. The levels were designed by Scott Davis, Danny Sosebee, Lee Rider, Joel Byers, Jim Treadway, Gabriel Beckett and Ron Degen. Music was composed by Ken Calderone, and graphics were by Nina, Dan Burke and Ken Beckett.

Crystal Mines II was released for the Nintendo DS in 2010 as Crystal Mines.

Gameplay

The player guides a robot down a series of mines to collect crystals of different colors (and worth different point values). Along the way, the robot encounters wooden blocks, which can be blown up or sawed through, boulders of different types, dirt, which can be shot away with the robot's blaster, and a variety of monsters. The robot can also discover shields, radioactivity protection, deposits of copper, silver and gold, and caches of TNT. The metal deposits become bonuses to the player's score, while the other items can be used to complete various levels of the game.

Reception
CVG Magazine reviewed the Lynx version in their May 1992 issue, giving it a rating of 83 out of 100.

Re-releases
In 2000, Songbird Productions produced a sequel, Crystal Mines II: Buried Treasure on CD-ROM for Microsoft Windows. This CD-ROM requires the original game and a Lynx-to-PC serial cable to run, allowing the editing and creation of all new levels. This was followed in 2003 by a cartridge release of Crystal Mines II: Buried Treasure with the original 181 levels and 125 new levels.

In 2010, Home Entertainment Suppliers released ports of Crystal Mines II for the Nintendo DS and iPhone under the title Crystal Mines.

In 2020, Crystal Mines II was re-release for the Evercade as part of the Atari Lynx Collection 1 cartridge. It features extra levels which were not part of the original Lynx cartridge.

References

External links
Atari Times review of Crystal Mines II
AtariAge page for Crystal Mines II
Songbird Productions page for Crystal Mines II: Buried Treasure
Interview with Ken Beckett, Crystal Mines and Crystal Mines II designer
Crystal Mines DS info page
Crystal Mines for iPhone info page
Atari Lynx Collection 1  for the Evercade

1992 video games
Atari Lynx games
Rocks-and-diamonds games
Video games developed in the United States